The Social Protection Network (Red de Protección Social in Spanish or RPS) is a Nicaraguan Conditional Cash Transfer program.  It is designed to address both current and future poverty via cash transfers targeted to households living in poverty in rural Nicaragua.  It began in 2000.

External links
 Red de Protección Social (RPS) Evaluation Dataset, 2000-2002
  Nicaragua: Red de Protección Social - Mi Familia
  The Coffee Crisis and RPS
  Pilot Program Proposal for RPS

Poverty-related organizations
Nicaragua
Social security in Nicaragua